William Tapia (January 1, 1908 – December 2, 2011), known as "Uncle Bill" and "Tappy", was an American musician, born to Portuguese parents. At age 8, Tapia was already a professional musician, playing "Stars and Stripes Forever" for World War I troops in Hawaii.

In his long career beginning in vaudeville and quickly expanding as a jazz guitarist and ukulele player he performed with names such as Bing Crosby, Louis Armstrong, Elvis Presley and Hawaiian musicians such as King Bennie Nawahi, Sol Hoʻopiʻi, and Andy Iona.  

The Chiang & Coates documentary "To You, Sweetheart, Aloha" was created to celebrate 94 year old Tapia's life.

Tapia was an associate of Sonny Cunha and played with the Johnny Noble Band at the opening of the Royal Hawaiian Hotel in 1927.  He taught Shirley Temple and Clark Gable to strum the ukulele.  He was also the ukulele player on Bing Crosy's hit "Blue Hawaii." Despite his long life, Tapia did not record any music until 2004 when he put out his first CD at the age of 96.  On March 23, 2004, he provided a detailed interview for the NAMM Oral History Program collection about his impressive career and life in music.  He recalled designing several instruments for many of his luthier friends as well as improvement and adjustments to the uke he had over the years.

He continued to perform and record at an advanced age, all the while remaining in vigorous health and driving a car until his 100th birthday when he began suffering eyesight problems.

Tapia was a featured performer in Mighty Uke: The Amazing Comeback of a Musical Underdog, a 2010 documentary on the ukulele.  In 2011, he was awarded The Academy of Recording Arts Lifetime Achievement Award.

Tapia died in his sleep on December 2, 2011, a month short of turning 104.

Discography 
 Tropical Swing, 2004
 Duke of Uke, 2005
 Livin' It Live, 2009
 Young at Heart: Japan Live, 2009
 Live Warner Grand Theatre: 100th Birthday Concert, 2009

References

External links

Interview with Uncle Bill Tapia – Part I – Free internet podcast featuring interview with Uncle Bill Tapia (part 1).
Interview with Uncle Bill Tapia – Part II – Free internet podcast featuring interview with Uncle Bill Tapia (part 2).
Uncle Bill Tapia Official Home Page
Brief article on the life of Bill Tapia
Award-winning PBS documentary film about Bill Tapia: "To You Sweetheart, Aloha"
Interview with Bill Tapia NAMM Oral History Library (2004)

1908 births
2011 deaths
American centenarians
Men centenarians
Musicians from Honolulu
American people of Portuguese descent
Hawaiian ukulele players
Mountain Apple Company artists